Phumlani Dlamini  (born 22 December 1988) is a Liswati footballer who plays the role of defender for  Manzini Sundowns F.C. and the Eswatini national team. He has been plying his trade in the Premier League of Eswatini for top teams Bush Bucks F.C., Royal Leopards F.C. and presently playing for Manzini Sundowns F.C. since 2012 till date.

Career
Phumlani Dlamini made his international debut for Swaziland against Sudan in 2011. He has received interest from top Barclays Premier League and other top European teams since he was with the Swaziland but has been having delay due to the English Premier League working permit rules on foreign players. Phumlani Dlamini even scored a goal against Djibouti in the 74th minutes.

He had played against the following international games for Swaziland since he made his senior national team debut game in 2011: Single leg games played was against Sudan, Tanzania, Burkina Faso, Botswana, Guinea Lesotho, DR Congo, Seychelles.
Recently in the year 2015/16, Phumlani has played five international games in which is FIFA World Cup Qualifier two Leg games (Home and away) against Nigeria, Lesotho and a single friendly game against South Africa.

Phumlani Dlamini International Games Statistics
He has played 14 International Games scoring a goal for the Swaziland Senior National team. His National team statistics is as stated below:
 COSAFA CUP - Played 218 minutes (3 Caps, Started 2 Games, 1 Game substituted in)
 CAF NATIONS CUP QUALIFIER- Played 360 minutes (4 Caps, Played the 4 full games)
 WORLD CUP QUALIFIER – Played 360 minutes (4 Caps, Played the 4 full games)
 INTERNATIONAL FRIENDLY GAMES- Played 360 minutes (4 Caps, Played the 4 full games)

References

External links
 
 
 
 
 - Euro Sport Data
 - Goal.com Profile

1988 births
Living people
Swazi footballers
Association football defenders
Swazi expatriate footballers
Expatriate soccer players in South Africa
Eswatini international footballers